In relief printing, a flong is a temporary negative paper mould made from an impression in a forme of set type or other relief matter, such as printing blocks. A flong is an intermediate step used to cast a metal stereotype (or "stereo") which can be used in letterpress printing on either flat-bed or rotary press. After the flong is made, the original type can be distributed (for hand-set composition) or melted-down (for hot-metal typesetting). A flong is part of the stereotype process.

Types of flong
The term flong was introduced no later than 1862 to refer to paper-based molds, also called a stereotype matrix (or mat, for short), which were in use no later than the early 1850s. These molds may have been made through the papier-mâché wet process, which involves macerating paper, though contemporary writers suggest that was inpractical. More commonly, flong refers to sheets of paper interleaved with paste or a solid cardboard-like industrially produced sheet like cardboard.

Prior to flongs, the following were used to moulding type to create stereos:
Clay. Invented by a French printer, Gabriel Valleyre in 1730. He pressed the set-up forme in clay or another earthy substance to make a reverse image, and then poured molten copper into the mould. His copies were not very good, due either to the clay he was using, or the softness of the copper. However, the method was later revived, improved, and used by Government Printing Office in Washington. Hoe & Company included  for use with the process in their 1881 catalogue.
Plaster of Paris. Gress was already describing this as an old method that had been displaced by the papier-mâché or paper process in 1909.. The plaster process can reproduce finer lines than the paper process, but has the disadvantage that the mould is broken to remove the stereo. This was the process developed by Gad in 1725, where a plaster mould is made of the set-up type. The process was perfected in 1802, but because there were relatively few books that needed repeated print-runs other than bibles or schoolbooks, the process did not come into widespread use for another two decades. The Bank of England printed its notes using stereos from plaster moulds in 1816. Charles Stanhope, 3rd Earl Stanhope had invested a considerable sum of money in developing the process, and he then established and funded a stereotyping plant in London.. However it was not a commercial success and faced considerable opposition from the printing trade.. David noted that it was only with the introduction of the flexible and robust papier-mâché flong in the 1850s that led to the extensive use of stereotyping for novel production.
Paper-based wet flong, referred to inaccurately as paper-mâché. The French printer Claude Genoux is frequently credited with inventing the papier-mâché process and he was granted a French patent for it in 1828. However, the process was described in a 1696 book in the University of Marburg. In the wet process, a number of layers of sheets of tissue and blotter paper are interleaved with a paste of flour, water, alum, and other ingredients. The paste could be to the stereotyper's own recipe or a proprietary paste. 
Dry flong, also known as the dry matrix or dry mat process. Here there is no need to beat the matrix into the page of type, as simple pressure is enough. The pressures needed are quite high and effectively require a hydraulic press. It appears to have been first invented in 1893 by George Eastwood in England, but versions were also produced in Germany in 1894 and in the United States in 1900. Use of the dry mat process was limited as the wet process could provide better quality, but improvements in the dry mats led to their replacing the wet process. By 1946, the dry mat process had completely taken over in newspaper publishing in the United States.

The process for making moulds for electrotypes was similar, except that these were made with soft materials such as beeswax or the naturally occurring mineral wax ozokerite. The thin electrotype shells had to be backed with type metal to a depth of 8mm make them robust enough for use.

The papier-mâché flong
Partridge describes the papier-mâché process thus: "A few sheets of thin paper are soaked in water until soft and then pasted together to form a flong. This flong is beaten into a page of type and dried, thus forming a matrix to receive the molten metal, which, when cooled, becomes an exact duplicate of the type page. A large number of duplicate casts may be made from the same matrix, either in flat form as required for flat-bed presses, or curved to fit the cylinders of rotary presses."
The flong was constructed by pasting together two sheets of wetted soft but tough matrix paper and four sheets of strong tissue paper. A rice-straw based tissue paper was used for the side of the flong facing the type. 
After making up the flong matrix, it can be kept for several days if kept suitably moist by wrapping in a wet blanket for example.
 
The flong slightly larger than the forme was laid over it and then carefully beaten into the forme of type using a brush with stiff bristles. Many gentle blows were better to fewer strong ones. Any hollows in the back of the flong after it was beaten in were filled, either with strawboard or pieces of flong or with a packing compound.  The flong was then covered with a sheet of backing paper and moved, still sitting on the forme, to a steam drying table. Here it was covered with four to eight pieces of soft blanket and pressed down to ensure that the flong stayed in contact with the forme while it dried. Drying took six to seven minutes typically, but this depended on the steam pressure.

The golden rule for stereotyping was to have cool metal and a hot box to avoid problems with shrinkage cavities on the face of the plate or sinks, where the face of the plate shrank away from the front. Sometimes a casting board was used to slow the cooling at the back of the casting, as this could help to avoid problems due to the flong being a poor conductor. Before casting, the casting box was heated. This could be done by ladling hot type metal into it as many as three times and removing the resulting plate. Alternatively, the mould could be gas-heated.

The dry flong was then trimmed, leaving just enough of a margin to go under the gauges in the casting box. These gauges were the pieces of metal, typically an L-shaped piece and a straight piece to border the sides and bottom of the flong in the casting box. The flong was then place in the casting box and the gauges placed at its sides. The box was closed up, with scrap paper used to form an apron to help funnel the molten type metal into the box.

The type metal mixture used for stereotype plates had from five to ten percent of tin and fifteen percent of antimony, with the balance in lead. The percentage of tin varies with the type of mould as tin makes the cast sharper. Five percent was fine for text letterpress, but ten percent was needed for half-tone blocks.

Illustrations of the papier-mâché process

The following illustrations from Stereotyping and Electrotyping (1880) by Frederick J. Wilson show some of the steps in the process of making and using a flong.

Multiple casts

Wheedon stated that a limited number of duplicate casts could be made from one flong. However, Partridge states  that a large number of duplicate casts may be made from the same matrix. Dalgin states that to his knowledge as many as thirty, and maybe more, plates have been cast from a single flong.

Printing historian Glenn Fleishman states that while flongs could make multiple casts, they typically could not be removed and reused. However, flongs might be made and then stored without being cast for future use, potentially for decades in the right conditions. Kubler noted that in 1941, the United States Government Publishing Office in Washington had over a quarter of a million flongs in "Mat Only" storage, "the mats being stored for future use and the type destroyed."

Etymology of the word flong
Wilson notes that the word flong is an English phonetic form of the French word flan, which is pronounced in almost exactly the same way. The word is attributed both to Claude Genoux who used the word flan in his original patent to describe the papier-mâché matrix, and to James Dellagana, a Swiss stereotyper in London. Apparently, when living in Paris, Dellagana frequently visited a café where he would eat a pastry called a flan, which was built up of different layers. However, flan or crème caramel is a solid custard, and does not resemble the way in which the flong is built up, with layers of paper interspersed with paste, instead rather closely resembles another popular French dessert, mille-feuille, dating to the 16th century.

Kubler states that the outside of France and England the general term for a papier-mâché mat was not a flong but a wet mat. However, several technical manuals from the United States use the terms including Kubler himself and Partridge, as well as the United States Bureau of Labor Statistics 1929 study of productivity in Newspaper Printing.

Further reading
Fleishman provides a thorough and well-illustrated explanation of the process in his blog. Dalgin provides a good overview of the mechanics of newspaper production in the middle of the 20th century, including different methods of reproduction. There are also books on the whole stereotype process such as those by Wilson, Partridge, Hatch and Stewart, and Salade.

In popular culture 
On 1 April 1977 The Guardian, a UK newspaper, published a seven-page special report on San Serriffe, an imaginary island to the north-east of the Seychelles. The hoax was full of typographical and printing puns, with towns named after different fonts. The indigenous inhabitants were said to be the Flong and their language was ki-flong. The hoax is well described, along with images of the pages in the seven page special report which perpetrated the hoax on the Museum of Hoaxes website. The Guardian followed up in 1978 with parodies of twelve UK and Irish newspapers across ten pages: The SS Guardian, The SS Financial Times, The SS Times, The SS Morning Star, The SS Mirror (half page), The SSun (half page), The SS Daily Express (half page), The SS Daily Mail (half page), The SS Irish Times, The SS Telegraph, The SS Sunday Times, and the News of the SS World. However, this was considered to be less successful than the original. Most of the parody newspapers make some reference to the flong. The San Serriffe hoax is ranked fifth in the top one hundred April Fool's Hoaxes by the Museum of Hoaxes.

Notes

References

Printing terminology